Clathrina is a genus of calcareous sponge in the family Clathrinidae. Several species formerly in Clathrina were transferred to the newly erected genera Arturia, Ernstia, Borojevia, and Brattegardia in 2013. The name is derived from the Latin word "clathratus" meaning "latticed".

Description
Species of Clathrina have a tubular organization as all species of the family Clathrinidae, with the cormus composed of anastomosed tubes. The skeleton contains spicules in the form of triactines and/or tetractines, sometimes with diactines, tripods and tetrapods as well. The choanoderm is usually flat, never forming folds when the sponge is extended.

Species 

There are 68 species assigned to Clathrina.

 Clathrina angraensis Azevedo & Klautau, 2007
 Clathrina antofagastensis Azevedo, Hajdu, Willenz & Klautau, 2009
 Clathrina aphrodita Azevedo, Cóndor-Luján, Willenz, Hajdu, Hooker & Klautau, 2015
 Clathrina arabica (Miklucho-Maclay in Haeckel, 1872)
 Clathrina arnesenae (Rapp, 2006)
 Clathrina aurea Solé-Cava, Klautau, Boury-Esnault, Borojevic & Thorpe, 1991
 Clathrina beckingae Van Soest & De Voogd, 2015
 Clathrina blanca (Miklucho-Maclay, 1868)
 Clathrina broendstedi Rapp, Janussen & Tendal, 2011
 Clathrina camura (Rapp, 2006)
 Clathrina cancellata (Verrill, 1873)
 Clathrina ceylonensis (Dendy, 1905)
 Clathrina chrysea Borojevic & Klautau, 2000
 Clathrina clara Klautau & Valentine, 2003
 Clathrina clathrus (Schmidt, 1864)
 Clathrina conifera Klautau & Borojevic, 2001
 Clathrina coriacea (Montagu, 1814)
 Clathrina cribrata Rapp, Klautau & Valentine, 2001
 Clathrina curacaoensis Cóndor-Luján, Louzada, Hajdu & Klautau, 2018
 Clathrina cylindractina Klautau, Solé-Cava & Borojevic, 1994
 Clathrina delicata Fontana, Cóndor-Luján, Azevedo, Pérez & Klautau, 2018
 Clathrina dictyoides (Haeckel, 1872)
 Clathrina fjordica Azevedo, Hajdu, Willenz & Klautau, 2009
 Clathrina flexilis (Haeckel, 1872)
 Clathrina globulosa Cóndor-Luján, Louzada, Hajdu & Klautau, 2018
 Clathrina helveola Wörheide & Hooper, 1999
 Clathrina heronensis Wörheide & Hooper, 1999
 Clathrina hispanica Klautau & Valentine, 2003
 Clathrina hondurensis Klautau & Valentine, 2003
 Clathrina insularis Azevedo, Padua, Moraes, Rossi, Muricy & Klautau, 2017
 Clathrina jorunnae Rapp, 2006
 Clathrina lacunosa (Johnston, 1842)
 Clathrina laminoclathrata Carter, 1886
 Clathrina loculosa (Haeckel, 1870)
 Clathrina lutea Azevedo, Padua, Moraes, Rossi, Muricy & Klautau, 2017
 Clathrina luteoculcitella Wörheide & Hooper, 1999
 Clathrina macleayi (Lendenfeld, 1885)
 Clathrina maremeccae Van Soest & De Voogd, 2018
 Clathrina multiformis (Breitfuss, 1898)
 Clathrina mutabilis Azevedo, Padua, Moraes, Rossi, Muricy & Klautau, 2017
 Clathrina mutsu (Hôzawa, 1928)
 Clathrina nuroensis Azevedo, Cóndor-Luján, Willenz, Hajdu, Hooker & Klautau, 2015
 Clathrina osculum Carter, 1886
 Clathrina parva Wörheide & Hooper, 1999
 Clathrina passionensis van Soest, Kaiser & Van Syoc, 2011
 Clathrina pedunculata (Lendenfeld, 1885)
 Clathrina pellucida (Rapp, 2006)
 Clathrina peruana Azevedo, Cóndor-Luján, Willenz, Hajdu, Hooker & Klautau, 2015
 Clathrina philippina (Haeckel, 1872)
 Clathrina primordialis (Haeckel, 1872)
 Clathrina procumbens (Lendenfeld, 1885)
 Clathrina pulcherrima (Dendy, 1891)
 Clathrina purpurea Van Soest & De Voogd, 2015
 Clathrina ramosa (Azevedo, Hajdu, Willenz & Klautau, 2009)
 Clathrina repens Van Soest & De Voogd, 2018
 Clathrina rodriguesensis Van Soest & De Voogd, 2018
 Clathrina rotunda Klautau & Valentine, 2003
 Clathrina rotundata Voigt, Erpenbeck & Wörheide, 2017
 Clathrina rowi Voigt, Erpenbeck & Wörheide, 2017
 Clathrina rubra Sarà, 1958
 Clathrina sceptrum (Haeckel, 1872)
 Clathrina sinusarabica Klautau & Valentine, 2003
 Clathrina smaragda Lopes, Padua, Cóndor-Luján & Klautau, 2018
 Clathrina sororcula Van Soest & De Voogd, 2015
 Clathrina stipitata (Dendy, 1891)
 Clathrina tendali Rapp, 2015
 Clathrina wistariensis Wörheide & Hooper, 1999
 Clathrina zelinhae Azevedo, Padua, Moraes, Rossi, Muricy & Klautau, 2017

See also
 Guancha apicalis

References 

 
Clathrinidae